Samuel Otis Brinton (born 1986/1987) is an American nuclear engineer and LGBTQ activist. They served as the deputy assistant secretary of Spent Fuel and Waste Disposition in the Office of Nuclear Energy from June to December 2022. Brinton is no longer employed by the Office of Nuclear Energy after being charged with luggage theft twice.

Brinton was the first openly genderfluid individual in federal government leadership, and uses singular they pronouns.

Early life and education 
Brinton was raised in Perry, Iowa and is the child of two Southern Baptist missionaries. Brinton came out as bisexual to their parents in the early 2000s. According to Brinton, their parents disapproved of Brinton's attraction to a male friend from school, and sent the then-middle school student for conversion therapy, an experience Brinton later described as "barbaric" and "painful" in a New York Times op-ed. During one particularly extreme conversion therapy session, Brinton stated that they were bound to a table while ice, heat, and electricity were applied to their body, all while being forced to watch film clips of gay intimacy.

Brinton has stated that parental physical abuse also became far more common in their life as they began to express their identity. Eventually, Brinton said that after it was clear that conversion therapy had not affected their sexuality, they were effectively disowned by their parents, with their father threatening to shoot Brinton in the head if Brinton ever returned home.

Journalist and gay activist Wayne Besen has expressed skepticism about Brinton's description of their childhood conversion therapy experience. Besen has noted inconsistencies in Brinton's retelling of events, as well as Brinton's being unable to remember the therapist's name despite having had two years of sessions with him. In the aftermath of 2022 allegations of luggage theft against Brinton, Besen reiterated his concerns and accused various people and groups of failing to heed "clear warning signs" and of making decisions to accept Brinton's recounting of their experience without confirming its veracity as "sloppy, ethically negligent, and shockingly unprofessional" behavior.

Brinton graduated from Perry High School in 2006 and from Kansas State University with a Bachelor of Science in nuclear engineering and vocal music in 2011. While attending the university, they organized its first pride march in 2010 and helped found Kansas' first LGBT resource center. They have a dual Master of Science degree in nuclear science and engineering (technology and policy program) in 2013 from the Massachusetts Institute of Technology. 

During Brinton's years at MIT, they cofounded Stand with Science, a national advocacy network to protect federal research funding, which in 2014, included 30 colleges and universities and had petitioned Congress with over 10,000 signatories in 2012 under Brinton's leadership. In 2014, Brinton was its executive director and also of the National Science Policy Group. They are a past president of MIT's Science Policy Initiative.

LGBTQ activism
Calling themselves a "survivor" of conversion therapy, Brinton was the first such individual to testify before the United Nations Convention against Torture regarding their experience in November 2014. Brinton was the advisory committee co-chair of the National Center for Lesbian Rights' #BornPerfect campaign. Brinton held the position until at least September 2015. They were one of three grand marshals of the 2015 Boston Pride Parade.

Brinton in 2016 founded the #50Bills50States campaign with the goal of prohibiting the pseudoscientific practice of conversion therapy throughout the U.S.

In 2016 and 2018, Brinton was the principal officer for the Washington DC chapter of the Sisters of Perpetual Indulgence, an LGBTQ charity and human rights group. At events, such as the organization's 40th anniversary, Brinton performed in drag under the name "Sister Ray Dee O'Active".

From 2017 to 2020, Brinton was the head of advocacy and government affairs at the non-profit LGBTQ youth suicide prevention organization The Trevor Project.

Career
In 2016, Brinton was a senior policy analyst for the Bipartisan Policy Center, lobbying for updated regulations so nuclear waste can be used to power advanced nuclear reactors. In February 2020, the website of Deep Isolation, a Berkeley, California nuclear waste storage and disposal company, listed them as Director of Legislative Affairs and in May 2022 they were Director of Global Political Strategy. In 2022, Brinton's profile at the Department of Energy (DOE) indicated previous work with the Breakthrough Institute, the Clean Air Task Force, and Third Way.

In 2022, Brinton became deputy assistant secretary for spent fuel and waste disposition in DOE’s Office of Nuclear Energy, serving in the Office of Spent Fuel and Waste Disposition. South Florida Gay News reported that, according to Brinton, while they were "welcomed with open arms" at all levels of the organization, others reacted to their appointment with hatred and disgust, some making death threats against them.

In February 2022, an unidentified Department of Energy employee filed allegations of hiring malpractice with the Office of the Inspector General due to concern regarding Brinton's qualifications for a Senior Executive Service (SES) level position, i.e. "the class of federal career officials who rank just below top presidential appointees in seniority".

Brinton supports the use of interim siting for radioactive waste to determine which sites and storage methods are best suited for future permanent repositories.

In November 2022, Brinton was placed on leave by the Department of Energy after they were charged with theft of luggage at an airport. On December 12, 2022, after a second similar charge for a July incident, a Department of Energy spokesperson confirmed that Brinton was no longer a DOE employee. Brinton was succeeded by acting deputy assistant secretary Kim Petry.

Theft allegations
In October 2022, Brinton was charged with felony theft after allegedly stealing a woman's suitcase from a Minneapolis–Saint Paul International Airport baggage carousel on September 16. In the case of a conviction the charges could carry a five-year sentence. Brinton appeared February 15, 2023, in Hennepin County, Minnesota and was released without bail.

A July 2022 incident resulted in a second arrest warrant, issued on December 8, 2022, for grand larceny after investigators matched Brinton to security camera footage of the theft at Harry Reid International Airport in Las Vegas. The case had been closed for lack of an identifiable suspect until news broke about Brinton's Minneapolis arrest. In the case of a conviction, the charges could carry a ten-year sentence. Brinton appeared before a Las Vegas court in mid-December where they did not enter a plea but posted $15,000 bail; a reappearance was scheduled for January.

In February 2023, a Tanzanian fashion designer said she had recognized custom-designed clothing she created, lost in a March 2018 airline luggage disappearance at Ronald Reagan Washington National Airport in Washington, D.C., being worn by Brinton in photos. She filed a police report in Houston in December 2022 after seeing the photos.

Personal life 
Brinton is bisexual and uses singular they pronouns. According to a 2017 Washington Blade local events article, Brinton resided in Washington, D.C., was a singer in the Gay Men's Chorus of Washington, D.C., and was engaged to Kevin Rieck.

Publications

References

External links 
 Archive of official website
 
 Yahoo! Life interview of Sam Brinton on being the first openly gender fluid person in federal government
 UN Committee Against Torture testimony

21st-century American LGBT people
Activists from Iowa
Biden administration controversies
Biden administration personnel
Bisexual non-binary people
Conversion therapy
Kansas State University alumni
LGBT appointed officials in the United States
LGBT people from Iowa
LGBT-related controversies in the United States
American LGBT rights activists
Living people
Massachusetts Institute of Technology alumni
Non-binary activists
People from Perry, Iowa
United States Department of Energy officials
Year of birth missing (living people)
Genderfluid people